Yemen participated in the 2006 Asian Games held in Doha, Qatar with a total of 24 athletes (24 male, 0 female) in six different sports.

Medalists

References

Nations at the 2006 Asian Games
2006
Asian Games